Allan Donald is a former Test and One Day International (ODI) cricketer who represented the South African cricket team between 1991, when the team's suspension from international cricket was lifted following the end of the apartheid regime, and 2003. A right-arm fast bowler, Donald was described by ESPNcricinfo writer Peter Robinson as "South Africa's greatest fast bowler". Donald took 330 wickets in Test cricket and 272 in ODIs, and remains the second highest wicket-taker of his country in ODIs as of 2013. The Wisden Cricketers' Almanack named him one of their cricketers of the year in 1992 and rated him the second best ODI bowler in 2003. During his international career, Donald took 22 five-wicket hauls. A five-wicket haul—also known as a five-for or fifer—refers to the feat of a bowler taking five or more wickets in a single innings. This is regarded as a notable achievement, and only 41 bowlers have at least 15 five-wicket hauls at international level in their cricketing careers.

Donald took a five-wicket haul in his ODI debut against India at the Eden Gardens, Kolkata in November 1991, taking 5 wickets for 29 runs, the fifth best performance by any bowler on ODI debut. Despite this South Africa lost the match, however, Donald secured a Man of the match award. He picked up another five-wicket haul in October 1996, against Kenya when he claimed 6 wickets for 23 runs at the Nairobi Gymkhana Club. The bowling figures are the second best by a South African as of 2013.

Donald made his Test debut against the West Indies in April 1992, collecting six wickets in the match. He took a five-wicket haul for the first time in Tests when he took 5 wickets for 55 runs against India during the third Test of a four-match series held later that year. He took another five wicket haul in the second innings, thus collecting 12 wickets for 139 runs in the match. Donald went on to repeat this feat against England in November 1999. His career-best bowling figures in an innings came when he took 8 wickets for 71 runs against Zimbabwe in 1995 at the Harare Sports Club. He was most successful against England, taking nine fifers. As of 2013, he is sixteenth overall among all-time combined five-wicket haul takers.

Key

Tests

One Day Internationals

Notes

References

South African cricket lists
Donald, Allan